On February 21–22, 1971, a devastating tornado outbreak, colloquially known as the Mississippi Delta outbreak, struck portions of the Lower Mississippi and Ohio River valleys in the Southern and Midwestern United States. The outbreak generated strong tornadoes from Texas to Ohio and North Carolina. The two-day severe weather episode produced at least 19 tornadoes, and probably several more, mostly brief events in rural areas; killed 123 people across three states; and wrecked entire communities in the state of Mississippi. The strongest tornado of the outbreak was an F5 that developed in Louisiana and crossed into Mississippi, killing 47 people, while the deadliest was an F4 that tracked across Mississippi and entered Tennessee, causing 58 fatalities in the former state. The former tornado remains the only F5 on record in Louisiana, while the latter is the deadliest on record in Mississippi since 1950. A deadly F4 also affected other parts of Mississippi, causing 13 more deaths. Other deadly tornadoes included a pair of F3s—one each in Mississippi and North Carolina, respectively—that collectively killed five people.

Background

At 12:00 UTC on February 21, 1971, surface weather analysis failed to indicate either a well-developed low-pressure area or a defined frontal boundary over the Gulf Coastal Plain, signs that would normally presage a severe weather outbreak. At the time, a diffuse warm front extended eastward from East Texas to portions of Mississippi, and a cold front extended southward over East Texas. Higher up in the atmosphere, conditions were "close to ideal" for a significant tornado outbreak: a broad trough imparted substantial divergence over the prefrontal warm sector.

Impact
Activity started early on the morning of February 21. The first tornadoes touched down in Texas east of Austin and north of Waco. The main activity intensified during the afternoon over the Mississippi and Tennessee Valleys until the late evening hours.  At 15:55 UTC the National Severe Storms Forecast Center (NSSFC) in Kansas City, Missouri, issued a tornado watch for eastern Arkansas, northern Mississippi, and adjourning portions of Tennessee and Alabama. A subsequent watch covered portions of eastern Louisiana and southwestern Mississippi, more than an hour before the first major tornado developed.

Three violent, long-lived tornadoes—two of which may have been tornado families—in western Mississippi and northeastern Louisiana caused most of the deaths along  of path. A third, F4 tornado traveled  through Little Yazoo, Mississippi, and near Lexington. At one point, the National Weather Service (NWS) WSR-57, a type of weather radar, in Jackson, Mississippi, reported four hook echoes, often indicative of tornado-producing supercells, simultaneously.

Although authorities issued timely tornado warnings—with an average lead time of about an hour in the worst-hit areas—few homes in the area were well constructed, and many lacked basements or other safe areas, thus contributing to the large number of deaths. Many residents were reportedly aware of the danger but could not find shelter in time. As a result, the violent tornadoes killed entire families and caused as many as 21 deaths in some communities. Many of the dead were blacks who resided in frail structures. The entire outbreak may have killed 113–119 people and injured as many as 2,003 others. In Mississippi alone, tornadoes officially killed 110 people and injured 1,469; of these, 454 persons were hospitalized. Some sources listed 107 deaths and 1,060–1,514 injuries in Mississippi.

Outbreak statistics

Confirmed tornadoes

The actual total was likely considerably higher, especially over rural areas. The following events may have occurred but were not officially documented and currently do not appear on any official database:
On February 21, at 00:30 UTC, a tornado may have hit Toccopola, Pontotoc County, Mississippi, according to a report by the National Oceanic and Atmospheric Administration (NOAA).
In all, the tornado destroyed or severely damaged 10 homes, 15 barns, and 14 other structures, along with a spacious brick church. Half a dozen cars were damaged as well, and at least one home lost its roof. Tornado researcher Thomas P. Grazulis listed the tornado as an F3.

February 21 event

February 22 event

Waverly–Melbourne, Louisiana/Delta City–Inverness–Moorhead, Mississippi

This devastating, long-lived tornado—of F5 intensity in Louisiana, F4 in Mississippi—was likely a family of multiple tornadoes. It first appeared aloft northwest of Crowville, Louisiana, before finally touching down south-southeast of Delhi. Along and northeast of U.S. Route 80, the tornado completely leveled a number of small homes at F5 intensity, though the homes may not have been well constructed. Three other homes, a rural church, and half a dozen large, overhead power lines were destroyed nearby. In all, the tornado destroyed as many as seven homes in the Delhi–Waverly area. After devastating Joes Bayou, the tornado mostly traversed unpopulated, forested country for the remainder of its path in Louisiana. As it continued northeastward, however, the tornado struck the Melbourne settlement on Pecan Road, a short distance south of Transylvania, near Alsatia. At Melbourne the tornado destroyed a pair of mobile homes and seven homes. 13 other mobile homes, 11 outbuildings, and a mature pecan grove were severely damaged as well. Vehicles and agricultural implements were tossed about, but only minor injuries occurred. In all, the tornado killed 11 people and injured 18 others in Louisiana, though some sources do not list the eleventh fatality. After striking Melbourne, the tornado crossed the Mississippi River and entered Mississippi. In 1984 and 1993 tornado researcher Thomas P. Grazulis assessed the tornado as having caused F4 damage in Louisiana, but in 2001 revised this to accept the official F5 rating.

Once in Mississippi, the tornado passed near Mayersville in Issaquena County. As it did so, it began to slowly weaken in intensity. It either began to restrengthen or dissipated and reformed as a new tornado in Sharkey County. This possible new tornado went on to produce F4 damage and retained intensity until dissipation. The tornado killed two people near Cameta and destroyed a cotton gin near Nitta Yuma. The tornado then devastated Delta City, killing seven people and destroying the entire community. The tornado continued northeastward, claiming two additional lives west of Isola. Afterward, it entered the town of Inverness as a large tornado, destroying an estimated 80–90% of the community, killing 21 people, and injuring 200 more. In town the tornado destroyed 125–153 homes, along with 40 other structures. 52 homes were badly damaged as well, 61 businesses were destroyed or damaged, and 30 outbuildings were destroyed on farms. The tornado destroyed the entire central business district, city hall, the three largest churches in town, and entire blocks of frail homes in the African-American section of town; many of these homes were "obliterated." Hundreds of people were left homeless, and railcars were tipped onto their sides. The tornado then leveled the northwestern side of Moorhead, killing four people there before ending near Schlater. In all, the tornado destroyed hundreds of homes along its path. It is the only official F5/EF5 to have hit the state of Louisiana since official tornado records began in 1950 and the only F5/EF5 tornado ever recorded in the month of February, although the F5 rating is disputed as many of the houses destroyed were small and frail. It was also the deadliest F5 tornado since the Candlestick Park tornado in 1966 killed 58 people across Mississippi and Alabama, but was later eclipsed by an EF5 tornado on April 27, 2011, that killed 72 people.

Cary–Gooden Lake–Pugh City–Morgan City–Money, Mississippi/Middleton, Tennessee

This, the deadliest and longest-lived of the three violent tornadoes, was likely a tornado family. Just south of Cary, the tornado destroyed the Evanna Plantation, killing 14 people there. The tornado then struck Cary, destroying the entire community. Continuing to the northeast, the tornado struck Gooden Lake, killing seven people there, and then struck Mound Lake Plantation, causing two additional fatalities. The tornado then passed through and completely destroyed the Joe Regh Plantation at Pugh City, reducing frail, low-income housing to "splinters," rolling farm machinery, and killing at least 21 people. Some sources listed an extra fatality at Pugh City. Extensive wind-rowing occurred as frame homes were completely swept away. The tornado killed two more people in Swiftown; six in Morgan City; two a few miles west of Greenwood, near Fort Loring; and four near Money. The tornado may have weakened and reformed into a separate event that passed through or near Avalon, Oxberry, Cascilla, and Tillatoba, causing scattered damage in those communities. Isolated stands of mature trees and willows were twisted, splintered, or prostrated, and outbuildings on farms were damaged. Bits of roofing, insulation, and wallpaper were torn off in Tillatoba.

This series of tornadoes apparently dissipated and reformed yet again near Abbeville. Areas in and near Oxford reported $500,000 in damage, the worst natural disaster in local history. A  mobile home lost its roof and most of its walls. Several large trees were downed or splintered as well. The tornado dissipated shortly thereafter. Its path was just a few miles east of the areas affected by the F5 tornado for most of its path, and several counties were affected by both tornadoes. With 58 fatalities, the tornado is the deadliest in Mississippi since 1950; however, the deadliest Mississippi tornado on record in the 20th century killed 216 people in 1936.

Non-tornadic effects

Aftermath, recovery, and records
An internal assessment by the Mississippi Power and Light Company determined that its infrastructure incurred the greatest wind-related damage in the company's history. Roughly half of its transmission towers were damaged in both Sharkey and Humphreys counties.

One of the tornadoes attained F5 intensity in Louisiana, the only such event on record in the state, although the rating is disputed. The entire outbreak is the second-deadliest ever in February, behind only the Enigma tornado outbreak in 1884 and ahead of the 2008 Super Tuesday tornado outbreak. February 21 was the fourth-deadliest day for tornadoes in Mississippi on record.

See also
List of North American tornadoes and tornado outbreaks
List of F5 and EF5 tornadoes
2008 Super Tuesday tornado outbreak – Second deadliest outbreak on record in February

Notes

References

Sources

F5 tornadoes
Tornadoes of 1971
Tornadoes in Louisiana
Tornadoes in Mississippi
Tornadoes in North Carolina
Tornadoes in Ohio
Tornadoes in Tennessee
1971 natural disasters in the United States
February 1971 events in the United States